Myuta (Mıytu) is a rural locality (a selo) in Shebalinsky District, the Altai Republic, Russia. The population was 274 as of 2016. There are 6 streets.

Geography 
Myuta is located 16 km north of Shebalino (the district's administrative centre) by road. Cherga and Shebalino are the nearest rural localities.

References 

Rural localities in Shebalinsky District